James Shannon (1799–1859) was an Irish American academic, evangelist and second President of the University of Missouri  He was born in Monaghan County, Ireland and educated at the Royal Belfast Academical Institution.  Shannon was also a co-founder of Columbia College and the first president of Culver-Stockton College.  He is buried at the Columbia Cemetery in Columbia, Missouri.

Shannon is the author of the 1855 pro-slavery pamphlet An address delivered before the Pro-slavery convention of the state of Missouri, held in Lexington, July 13, 1855, on domestic slavery, as examined in the light of Scripture, of natural rights, of civil government, and the constitutional power of Congress.

See also
History of the University of Missouri

References

External links
University of Missouri archives biography

1799 births
1859 deaths
Leaders of the University of Missouri
People from Columbia, Missouri
People educated at the Royal Belfast Academical Institution
Columbia College (Missouri) faculty
Burials at Columbia Cemetery (Columbia, Missouri)
Culver–Stockton College faculty
Religion in Columbia, Missouri
American proslavery activists